Isla del Sol is the ninth album by Mexican pop singer Yuri. It was released on October 17, 1988. After this success, Sony Music offered her better international exposure, leading her to change to Sony from EMI Music. The album sold more than 350,000 copies, earning a Platinum disc. She released a Portuguese version, receiving a Gold disc in Brazil.

Track listing

Track listing (Brazilian Edition)

Track listing EP

Production
 Producers: Loris Cerrone and Gian Pietro Felisatti
 Director: Gian Pietro Felisatti
 Recording at: Baby Studios (Milan), Cerroni (Bologna), Eurosonic (Madrid) and Torres Sonido (Madrid)
 Musical Arrangements: Loris Cerrone, Gian Pietro Felisatti and Santanoe
 Sound Engineers: Loris Cerrone and Másimo Noé
 Voice Engineer and Mix: José Antonio Alvarez Alija
 Graphic Design: Antonio M. Parra
 Stylist and Look: Manolo Mora

Singles
SPANISH
 Hombres al borde de un ataque de celos
 Hola
 No puedo más
 Isla del Sol
 Imposible amarte como yo
 Entre mujer y marido

PORTUGUESE
 Hey, hey
 Não somos iguais
 Todas
 Grito de paixão

Single Charts

References

1988 albums
Yuri (Mexican singer) albums